The 1929 Beacom College football team represented Beacom College (now known as Goldey–Beacom College) in the 1929 college football season as an independent. Led by coach John D. Naylor, Beacom compiled a 3–2 record in the school's first season.

Schedule

References

Beacom College
Beacom College football seasons
Beacom College football